The Joint Opposition was a political alliance formed by a faction of the Sri Lanka Freedom Party (SLFP) alongside several of the major quasi-left-wing parties of Sri Lanka. It was once the largest opposition group in the Sri Lankan Parliament. It was formed after the two major parties, the SLFP and the United National Party (UNP) forming a unity government, leading to a great degree of discontent amongst many SLFP members (mostly those loyal to former President Mahinda Rajapaksa), who then went on to form the Joint Opposition alongside other parties from the United People's Freedom Alliance (UPFA). It aims to give voice to the mandate voters provided to the UPFA at the 2015 general election in which many loyal SLFP members felt abandoned when the party joined the UNP-led government.

The organization largely consisted of Mahinda Rajapaksa loyalists and was very critical of the administration of President Maithripala Sirisena and Prime Minister Ranil Wickremasinghe. The alliance also prominently included individuals outside the parliament such as D. E. W. Gunasekera and G. L. Peiris who were denied parliamentary seats due to President Sirisena's decision to appoint defeated loyalists into parliament through the National List. The leader of the Joint Opposition was Mahajana Eksath Peramuna leader Dinesh Gunawardena.

Constituent Parties
Sri Lanka Freedom Party (Rajapaksa faction)
Lanka Sama Samaja Party
Mahajana Eksath Peramuna
Democratic Left Front
National Freedom Front
Pivithuru Hela Urumaya

References

External links

2015 establishments in Sri Lanka
Defunct political party alliances in Sri Lanka
Political parties established in 2015